John S. Whittaker (March 8, 1817 – c. 1897) was a justice of the Louisiana Supreme Court from 1863 to 1865, although he never served in the role. He was commissioned by Governor George Foster Shepley first as a judge of the Second District Court of the Parish of New Orleans, and then as an associate justice by the occupying Federal State Government during the American Civil War, but the court never met during that time. Born in Massachusetts, he also served as Criminal District Judge of New Orleans during the latter part of the war period.

References

1817 births
1890s deaths
People from Massachusetts
Justices of the Louisiana Supreme Court